The California two-spot octopus (Octopus bimaculoides), often simply called a "bimac", is an octopus species native to many parts of the Pacific Ocean including the coast of California. One can identify the species by the circular blue eyespots on each side of its head. Bimacs usually live to be about two years old. They are closely related to Verrill's two-spot octopus (Octopus bimaculatus). In 2015, the genome was sequenced.

Description
Octopus bimaculoides reaches a mantle size of 17.5 cm (7 inches) with arms to 58 cm (23 inches). Not usually heavily textured, it has several common colors, such as grey with yellow splotches, and uses highly developed crypsis (camouflage or color-changing to match the environment).

Octopuses achieve color change in part by chromatophores, iridophores, and leucophores; all are structures of the skin in increasing depth. Chromatophores are elastic pigment sacs with muscle fibers attached by which they can expand and contract. The leucophores are important because they allow for the reflection of white light and consequently allow the skin to reflect wavelengths of light which are prevalent in their habitat and produce disruptive patterns. The other aspect to cephalopod camouflage is the brain, which contains nerves coated in chromatophore fibers, controlling coloration patterning.

This octopus is named for the false eye spot (ocellus) under each real eye. These ocelli are an iridescent blue, chain-link circle set in a circle of black.

Distribution and habitat
O. bimaculoides can be found in coastal waters from the intertidal down to at least 20 m (65 ft) in the eastern Pacific along mid- and southern-California and the western side of the Baja California Peninsula in Mexico.

This species of octopus is found in subtidal to a depth of 20 m (65 ft). It prefers rocky reefs or debris for hiding. It tolerates a wide temperature range 15-26 °C (60-80 °F), though it prefers 18-22 °C (65-72 °F).

Ecology and behaviour

Lifespan 
These octopuses live one to two years. The end is signaled by egg-laying in the female and senescence in both males and females.

Diet 
Hatchlings feed on amphipods or mysid shrimp.

Genetics
In recent years new technology, such as genome sequencing, has provided new information on the large amounts of clustered protocadherins (PCDH) in Octopus bimaculoides. The octopus was found to have 168 PCDH genes, about 120 clustered and 50 non-clustered PCDH. Unlike what has been documented about mammalian clustered PCDH, octopus PCDH are clustered around the genome in an organized manner creating a head-to-tail arrangement.

References

External links

TONMO.com: Octopus bimaculoides Care Sheet
 Video of Octopus bimaculoides (California two-spot octopus)

Octopuses
Molluscs of the Pacific Ocean
Cephalopods of North America
Western North American coastal fauna
Fauna of California
Molluscs of Oceania
Molluscs described in 1949